Simón Darío Ramírez (1930–1992) was a Venezuelan poet.

Publications
Furrows of the first planting, 1965.
The walls ashen, 1966.
Ceremonies for a day, 1966.
About the sky Lespugue, 1968.
Dawn was then, 1969.
The game space, 1969.
Caribay, 1970.
Mirror on fire, 1972.
Manuscript Fragments of a king without attributes, 1974.
Stone head and Sleep, 1975
Assumption of the elements, 1976.
The iris of oblivion, 1983.
The scars of the house, 1983.
Letter deck, 1984.
Hallucinations, 1987

1930 births
1992 deaths
Venezuelan male poets
20th-century Venezuelan poets
20th-century male writers